The Voronezh, also romanized as Voronež, is a river in Tambov, Lipetsk, and Voronezh oblasts in Russia, a left tributary of the Don. It freezes up in the first half of December and stays under the ice until late March. The lower reaches of the river are navigable. The cities of Lipetsk and Voronezh are along the Voronezh River.

West of Michurinsk it swings east and splits into the Lesnoy and Polny Voronezh Rivers ("Forest and Field Voronezh"). To the north are tributaries of the Oka. To the east are the basins of the south-flowing Bityug which joins the Don and the north-flowing Tsna which reaches the Oka via the Moksha. 

The river is named for an earlier town destroyed by the Mongol invasion, whose name in turn was borrowed from a place name in the Principality of Chernigov, derived from the personal name Voroneg. From the 1650s the Belgorod Line of forts ran along the Voronezh. In 1706 Peter the Great built boats along the Voronezh and sailed them down the Don to attack the Turkish fortress of Azov.

References 

Rivers of Lipetsk Oblast
Rivers of Tambov Oblast
Rivers of Voronezh Oblast